The 1997–98 Iraqi Premier League was the 24th season of the competition since its foundation in 1974. For the first time in the competition's history, there were three teams that were in contention for the title on the last day of the season: Al-Quwa Al-Jawiya, Al-Shorta and Al-Zawraa.

Al-Quwa Al-Jawiya were playing Al-Zawraa on the final day (22 May) at the same time as Al-Shorta played Al-Sulaikh. Al-Quwa Al-Jawiya needed a win to guarantee the title, whereas Al-Shorta needed Al-Quwa Al-Jawiya to lose or draw and needed to win their game in order to win the league. For Al-Zawraa to win the league, they needed to beat Al-Quwa Al-Jawiya and needed Al-Shorta to draw or lose their match.

Al-Quwa Al-Jawiya drew 1–1 with Al-Zawraa, while Al-Shorta were losing 2–1 against Al-Sulaikh before an 84th-minute goal and a 91st-minute penalty kick saw them win 3–2 and clinch the title. Al-Quwa Al-Jawiya players and fans thought that Al-Shorta had drawn their game and celebrated on the pitch thinking they had won the league, with manager Ayoub Odisho being interviewed on live television. Midway through the interview, the stadium announcer announced that Al-Shorta had won 3–2 and had therefore won the league, causing Odisho to stop talking and stand still with a shocked expression.

Al-Shorta set a new league record of eleven consecutive wins on their way to the title, and also scored in all 30 of their matches.

League table

Results

Season statistics

Top scorers

Hat-tricks

Notes
4 Player scored 4 goals
6 Player scored 6 goals

References

External links
 Iraq Football Association

Iraqi Premier League seasons
1997–98 in Iraqi football
Iraq